John "Johnny"/"Johny" Thomas ( – 25 September 1954) was a Welsh rugby union, and professional rugby league footballer who played in the 1900s, 1910s and 1920s.

Background
Johnny Thomas was born in Aberkenfig, Wales, after retiring from playing, he joined the Wigan boards of directors, and he died  aged 73 in Ince district, Lancashire, England.

Playing career

International honours
Johnny Thomas won caps for Wales (RL) while at Wigan including in 1908 against New Zealand, and won caps for Great Britain (RL) while at Wigan in 1908 against New Zealand, and Australia, in 1909 against Australia (2 matches), on the 1910 Great Britain Lions tour of Australia and New Zealand against Australia (2 matches), and Australasia (2 matches), and New Zealand, and in 1911 against Australia.

County honours
Johnny Thomas won caps for Glamorgan (RU) while at Cardiff, including against Devonshire, and won a caps for Glamorgan (RL), and Lancashire (RL) while at Wigan.

Championship final appearances
Johnny Thomas played  in Wigan's 7-3 victory over Oldham in the Championship Final during the 1908–09 season at The Willows, Salford on Saturday 1 May 1909.

County League appearances
Johnny Thomas played in Wigan's victories in the Lancashire County League during the 1908–09 season, 1910–11 season, 1911–12 season, 1912–13 season, 1913–14 season and 1914–15 season.

County Cup Final appearances
Johnny Thomas played , i.e. number 9 (in a 15-player team), in Wigan's 0-0 draw with Leigh in the 1905 Lancashire County Cup Final during the 1905–06 season at Wheater's Field, Broughton, on Saturday 2 December 1905, played , and scored a try in the 8-0 victory over Leigh in the 1905 Lancashire County Cup Final replay during the 1905–06 season at Wheater's Field, Broughton, on Monday 11 December 1905, played  (in a 13-player team), and scored a try in the 10-9 victory over Oldham in the 1908 Lancashire County Cup Final during the 1908–09 season at Wheater's Field, Broughton, on Saturday 19 December 1908, played  (in a 13-player team), and scored a try in the 22-5 victory over Leigh in the 1909 Lancashire County Cup Final during the 1909–10 season at Wheater's Field, Broughton, on Saturday 27 November 1909. and played , and scored a goal in the 21-5 victory over Rochdale Hornets in the 1912 Lancashire County Cup Final during the 1912–13 season at Weaste, Salford, on Wednesday 11 December 1912.

Notable tour matches
Johnny Thomas played , and scored a try, and 2-goals in Wigan's 16-8 victory over Australia in the 1908–09 Kangaroo tour of Great Britain match at Central Park, Wigan, on Wednesday 20 January 1909, and played , and scored a goal in the 7-2 victory over Australia in the 1911–12 Kangaroo tour of Great Britain match at Central Park, Wigan, on Saturday 28 October 1911.

Testimonial match
A Testimonial match at Wigan was shared by; Bert Jenkins, Dick Ramsdale, and Johnny Thomas.

References

External links
!Great Britain Statistics at englandrl.co.uk (statistics currently missing due to not having appeared for both Great Britain, and England)
Statistics at wigan.rlfans.com

1880s births
1954 deaths

Year of birth uncertain
Cardiff RFC players
Footballers who switched code
Glamorgan County RFC players
Great Britain national rugby league team captains
Great Britain national rugby league team players
Lancashire rugby league team players
Maesteg RFC players
Rugby league players from Bridgend County Borough
Place of death missing
Rugby league five-eighths
Rugby league halfbacks
Rugby union fullbacks
Rugby union players from Aberkenfig
Rugby union scrum-halves
Wales national rugby league team players
Welsh rugby league players
Welsh rugby union players
Wigan Warriors players